The Battle of Belleau Wood (1–26 June 1918) occurred during the German spring offensive in World War I, near the Marne River in France. The battle was fought between the U.S. 2nd (under the command of Major General Omar Bundy) and 3rd Divisions along with French and British forces against an assortment of German units including elements from the 237th, 10th, 197th, 87th, and 28th Divisions. The battle has become a key component in the lore of the United States Marine Corps.

Background

In March 1918, with nearly 50 additional divisions freed by the Russian surrender on the Eastern Front, the German Army launched a series of attacks on the Western Front, hoping to defeat the Allies before U.S. forces could be fully deployed. A third offensive launched in May against the French between Soissons and Reims, known as the Third Battle of the Aisne, saw the Germans reach the north bank of the Marne River at Château-Thierry,  from Paris, on 27 May. On 31 May, the 7th Machine Gun Battalion of the U.S. 3rd Division supported the Senegalese Tirailleurs in holding the German advance at Château-Thierry, in hard house-to-house fighting, and the German advance turned right towards Vaux and Belleau Wood.

On 1 June, Château-Thierry and Vaux fell, and German troops moved into Belleau Wood. The U.S. 2nd Infantry Division—which included a brigade of U.S. Marines—was brought up along the Paris-Metz highway. The 9th Infantry Regiment was placed between the highway and the Marne, while the 6th Marine Regiment was deployed to their left. The 5th Marine and 23rd Infantry regiments were placed in reserve.

Battle

On the evening of 1 June, German forces punched a hole in the French lines to the left of the Marines' position. By the night of 2 June, the U.S. forces held a  front line north of the Paris-Metz Highway running through grain fields and scattered woods, from Triangle Farm west to Lucy and then north to Hill 142. The German line opposite ran from Vaux to Bouresches to Belleau.

German advance halted at Belleau Wood
German commanders ordered an advance on Marigny and Lucy through Belleau Wood as part of a major offensive, in which other German troops would cross the Marne River. The commander of the Marine Brigade, Army General James Harbord, countermanding a French order to dig trenches further to the rear, ordered the Marines to "hold where they stand". With bayonets, the Marines dug shallow fighting positions from which they could shoot from the prone position. In the afternoon of 3 June, German infantry attacked the Marine positions through the grain fields with bayonets fixed. The Marines waited until the Germans were within  before opening deadly rifle fire which mowed down waves of German infantry and forced the survivors to retreat into the woods.

Having suffered heavy casualties, the Germans dug in along a defensive line from Hill 204, just east of Vaux, to Le Thiolet on the Paris-Metz Highway and northward through Belleau Wood to Torcy. After Marines were repeatedly urged to turn back by retreating French forces, Marine Captain Lloyd W. Williams of the 2nd Battalion, 5th Marines uttered the now-famous retort "Retreat? Hell, we just got here." Williams' battalion commander, Major Frederic Wise, later claimed to have said the famous words.

On 4 June, Major General Bundy—commanding the 2nd Division—took command of the American sector of the front. Over the next two days, the Marines repelled the continuous German assaults. The 167th French Division arrived, giving Bundy a chance to consolidate his  of front. Bundy's 3rd Brigade held the southern sector of the line, while the Marine brigade held the north of the line from Triangle Farm.

Attack on Hill 142
At 03:45 on 6 June, the Allies launched an attack on the German forces, who were preparing their own strike. The French 167th Division attacked to the left of the American line, while the Marines attacked Hill 142 to prevent flanking fire against the French. As part of the second phase, the 2nd Division were to capture the ridge overlooking Torcy and Belleau Wood, as well as occupying Belleau Wood. However, the Marines failed to scout the woods. As a consequence, they missed a regiment of German infantry dug in, with a network of machine gun nests and artillery.

At dawn, 1st Battalion, 5th Marines—commanded by Major Julius Turrill—was to attack Hill 142, but only two companies were in position. The Marines advanced in waves with bayonets fixed across an open wheat field that was swept with German machine gun and artillery fire, and many Marines were cut down. Captain Crowther commanding the 67th Company was killed almost immediately. At this point, Hamilton had lost all five junior officers, while the 67th had only one commissioned officer alive. Hamilton reorganized the two companies, establishing strong points and a defensive line.

In the German counter-attack, Gunnery Sergeant Ernest A. Janson—who was serving under the name Charles Hoffman—repelled an advance of 12 German soldiers, killing two with his bayonet before the others fled; for this action he became the first Marine to receive the Medal of Honor in World War I.  Also cited for advancing through enemy fire during the counter-attack was Marine Gunner Henry Hulbert who was awarded the Distinguished Service Cross.

The rest of the battalion now arrived and went into action. Turrill's flanks lay unprotected, and the Marines were rapidly exhausting their ammunition. By the afternoon, however, the Marines had captured Hill 142, at a cost of nine officers and most of the 325 men of the battalion.

Marines attack Belleau Wood

On the night of 4 June, the intelligence officer for the 6th Marines, Lieutenant William A. Eddy, and two men stole through German lines to gather information about German forces. They gathered valuable information showing the Germans were consolidating machine gun positions and bringing in artillery. While this activity indicated an attack was not immediately likely, their increasing strength was creating a base of attack that raised concern about them breaking through to Paris.

At 17:00 on 6 June, the 3rd Battalion, 5th Marines (3/5)—commanded by Major Benjamin S. Berry—and the 3rd Battalion 6th Marines (3/6)—commanded by Major Berton W. Sibley, on their right—advanced from the west into Belleau Wood as part of the second phase of the Allied offensive. Again, the Marines had to advance through a waist-high wheat field into machine gun fire. One of the most famous quotations in Marine Corps history came during the initial step-off for the battle when First Sergeant Dan Daly, a recipient of two Medals of Honor who had served in the Philippines, Santo Domingo, Haiti, Peking, and Vera Cruz, prompted his men of the 73rd Machine Gun Company forward with the words: "Come on, you sons of bitches. Do you want to live forever?"

The first waves of Marines—advancing in well-disciplined lines—were slaughtered; Major Berry was wounded in the forearm during the advance. On his right, the Marines of Major Sibley's 3/6 Battalion swept into the southern end of Belleau Wood and encountered heavy machine gun fire, sharpshooters, and barbed wire. Marines and German infantrymen were soon engaged in hand-to-hand fighting. The casualties sustained on this day were the highest in Marine Corps history up to that time. Some 31 officers and 1,056 men of the Marine brigade were casualties. However, the Marines now had a foothold in Belleau Wood.

Fighting in Belleau Wood

The battle was now deadlocked. At midnight on 7–8 June, a German attack was stopped cold and an American counter-attack in the morning of 8 June was similarly defeated. Sibley's battalion—having sustained nearly 400 casualties—was relieved by the 1st Battalion, 6th Marines. Major Shearer took over the 3rd Battalion, 5th Marines for the wounded Berry. On 9 June, an enormous American and French barrage devastated Belleau Wood, turning the formerly attractive hunting preserve into a jungle of shattered trees. The Germans counter-fired into Lucy and Bouresches and reorganized their defenses inside Belleau Wood.

In the morning of 10 June, Major Hughes' 1st Battalion, 6th Marines—together with elements of the 6th Machine Gun Battalion—attacked north into the wood. Although this attack initially seemed to be succeeding, it was also stopped by machine gun fire. The commander of the 6th Machine Gun Battalion—Major Cole—was mortally wounded. Captain Harlan Major—senior captain present with the battalion—took command. The Germans used great quantities of mustard gas. Next, Wise's 2nd Battalion, 5th Marines was ordered to attack the woods from the west, while Hughes continued his advance from the south.

At 04:00 on 11 June, Wise's men advanced through a thick morning mist towards Belleau Wood, supported by the 23rd and 77th companies of the 6th Machine Gun Battalion, and elements of the 2nd Battalion, 2nd Engineers and were cut to pieces by heavy fire. Platoons were isolated and destroyed by interlocked machine gun fire. It was discovered that the battalion had advanced in the wrong direction. Rather than moving northeast, they had moved directly across the wood's narrow waist. However, they smashed the German southern defensive lines. A German private, whose company had 30 men left out of 120, wrote "We have Americans opposite us who are terribly reckless fellows."

Overall, the woods were attacked by the Marines a total of six times before they could successfully expel the Germans. They fought off parts of five divisions of Germans, often reduced to using only their bayonets or fists in hand-to-hand combat.

On 26 June, the 3rd Battalion, 5th Marines, under command of Major Maurice E. Shearer, supported by two companies of the 4th Machine Gun Battalion and the 15th Company of the 6th Machine Gun Battalion, made an attack on Belleau Wood, which finally cleared that forest of Germans. On that day, Major Shearer submitted a report simply stating, "Woods now U.S. Marine Corps entirely", ending one of the bloodiest and most ferocious battles U.S. forces would fight in the war.

Aftermath

United States forces suffered 9,777 casualties, included 1,811 killed. Many are buried in the nearby Aisne-Marne American Cemetery. There is no clear information on the number of German soldiers killed, although 1,600 were taken prisoner.

After the battle, the French renamed the wood Bois de la Brigade de Marine ('Wood of the Marine Brigade') in honor of the Marines' tenacity. The French government also later awarded the 5th and 6th Marine Regiments and the 6th Machine Gun Battalion the Croix de guerre. An official German report classified the Marines as "vigorous, self-confident, and remarkable marksmen ..." General Pershing—commander of the AEF—said, "The deadliest weapon in the world is a United States Marine and his rifle." Pershing also said "the Battle of Belleau Wood was for the U.S. the biggest battle since Appomattox and the most considerable engagement American troops had ever had with a foreign enemy."

Legend and lore has it that the Germans used the term Teufelshunde ('devil dogs') for the Marines. However, this has not been confirmed, as the term was not commonly known in contemporary German. The closest common German term would be Höllenhunde which means 'hellhound'. Regardless of the term's origin, ten years after the battle, Lieutenant Colonel Ernst Otto, from the Historical Section of the German Army, wrote of the Marine Corps: "Their fiery advance and great tenacity were well recognized by their opponents."

Legacy
Marines actively serving in the Fifth and Sixth Marine regiments were authorized to wear the French fourragère on the left shoulder of their uniform to recognize the legacy and valor of their regimental predecessors.

In June 1923, the Marine Band performed a new march called "Belleau Wood" for the first time during the annual Belleau Wood anniversary celebration. Composed by then Second Leader Taylor Branson, who would later lead the Marine Band from 1927 to 1940, it was dedicated to Army Major General James. G. Harbord, who commanded the Marines during the battle.

In July 1923, Belleau Wood was dedicated as an American battle monument. Major General Harbord was made an honorary Marine and attended the event. In his address, he summed up the future of the site:

White crosses and Stars of David mark 2,289 graves, 250 for unknown service members, and the names of 1,060 missing men adorn the wall of a memorial chapel. Visitors also stop at the nearby German cemetery where 8,625 men are buried; 4,321 of them—3,847 unknown—rest in a common grave. The German cemetery was established in March 1922, consolidating a number of temporary sites, and includes men killed between the Aisne and the Marne in 1918, along with 70 men who died in 1914 in the First Battle of the Marne.

On 18 November 1955, a black marble monolith with a bronze relief of a fighting Marine was dedicated at a road clearing near the site of the battle. Simply entitled The Marine Memorial, it was sculpted by Felix de Weldon, the artist who had also formed the Marine Corps War Memorial outside of Washington, D.C. The memorial honors the 4th Marine Brigade for their bravery here in June 1918, and is the only memorial in Europe dedicated solely to the United States Marines. Below the statue is a commemorative plaque with a large Eagle, Globe, and Anchor. The plaque includes a brief history of the battle, with text in both English and French. Officiating at the monument's dedication ceremony was then Commandant of the Marine Corps, General Lemuel C. Shepherd Jr., who had fought and was twice wounded at Belleau Wood, and later awarded the Army Distinguished Service Cross and the Navy Cross for his gallantry in action, 37 years earlier.

In New York City, a  triangle at the intersection of 108 Street and 51st Avenue in Queens is dedicated to Marine Private William F. Moore, 47th Company, 2nd Battalion, 5th Marine Regiment.

In Boston, a square at the intersection of E Street and 6th Avenue in South Boston is dedicated to Marine Private Thomas Henry Joyce, 47th Company, 3rd Battalion, 5th Marine Regiment.  Joyce was posthumously awarded the Croix de Guerre with bronze star for his actions at Belleau Wood: "A most audacious liaison agent. Killed on the night of June 24, 1918, after having on five successive occasions carried messages to the company post of command under violent fire of machine guns and artillery."

Two U.S. Navy vessels have been named for the battle. The first  was a light aircraft carrier active during World War II in the Pacific Theater, from 1943 to 1945. From 1953 to 1960, she was loaned to the French Navy under the name Bois Belleau and served in the First Indochina and Algerian Wars. The second  was active from 1977 to 2005.

A shortened version of Lloyd Williams' famous quote is the basis for the motto the 2nd Battalion, 5th Marines, his unit during the battle. Williams himself has been honored with a building on the campus of his alma mater Virginia Polytechnic Institute and State University named in remembrance of him.

In April 2018, French President Emmanuel Macron presented to the United States a sessile oak sapling from Belleau Wood as part of his state visit.

References

Further reading

 Alexander, Joseph H. Three Touchstone Battles: Belleau Wood, Iwo Jima, Chosin Reservoir. Quantico, VA: Marine Corps Association, 1997.  
 Andriot, R. Belleau Wood and the American Army: the 2nd and 26th Divisions (June and July 1918). Foster, RI: Brass Hat, 1986. 
 Asprey, Robert B. At Belleau Wood. New York: Putnam [1965]. 
 Axelrod, Alan. Miracle at Belleau Wood: the birth of the modern U.S. Marine Corps. Guilford, CN: Lyons Press, 2007.  
 Bonk, David, and Peter Dennis. Château Thierry & Belleau Wood 1918: America's Baptism of Fire on the Marne. Botley, Oxford, UK: Osprey Pub, 2007.  
 Bosco, Peter I., and Antoinette Bosco. World War I. New York: Facts on File, 2003.  
 Brady, James. Why Marines fight. New York: Thomas Dunne Books/St. Martin's Press, 2007.  
 Camp, Richard D. Leatherneck legends: conversations with the Marine Corps' Old Breed. St. Paul, MN: Zenith Press, 2006.  
 Camp, Richard D. The Devil Dogs at Belleau Wood: U.S. Marines in World War I. Minneapolis, MN: Zenith Press, 2008.  
 Catlin, Albertus W., and Walter A. Dyer. "With the help of God and a few Marines": the battles of Chateau Thierry and Belleau Wood. Yardley: Westholme, [2013].  
 Clark, George B. Devil dogs: fighting Marines of World War I. Novato, CA: Presidio Press, 1999.  
 Clark, George B. The History of the Third Battalion 5th Marines, 1917–1918. Pike, NH: Brass Hat, 1996. 
 Clark, George B. Their time in hell: the 4th Marine Brigade at Belleau Wood, June 1918. Pike, NH: Brass Hat, 1996. 
 Cowley, Robert. The Great War: perspectives on the First World War. New York: Random House, 2003.  
 Crocker, H.W. The Yanks are coming: a military history of the United States in World War I. Washington, DC: Regnery Publishing, 2014.  
 Daniels, Josephus, William, John J. Pershing, and Charles F. Horne. Château-Thierry and Belleau Wood: how America held back the Germans at the Marne, May 31st–July 1st. S.l: s.n, 1923 
 Devil Dogs Chronicle: Voices of the 4th Marine Brigade in World War I. Lawrence, KS: University Press of Kansas, 2013.  
 Dowswell, Paul. War stories: true stories from the first and second World Wars. Tulsa, OK: EDC Publishing, 2006.  
 Eisenhower, John S. D., and Joanne Thompson Eisenhower. Yanks: the epic story of the American Army in World War I. New York: Free Press, 2001.  
 Farwell, Byron. Over there: the United States in the Great War, 1917–1918. New York: Norton, 2000.  
 Fenster, J. M. Lafayette Escadrille The Battle of Belleau Wood. [United States]: Buckingham, Beacon Hardy, 1996.  
 Fenster, J. M. World War I: voices from the front. [United States]: Buckingham, Beacon Hardy, 1996.  
 Fleming, Thomas J. Days of valor. Chicago: Follett Educational, 1970. 
 Grant, R. G. World War I: the definitive visual history: from Sarajevo to Versailles. New York: DK Publishing, 2014.  
 Hallas, James H. Doughboy war: the American Expeditionary Force in World War I. Boulder, CO: Lynne Rienner Publishers, 2000.  
 Harbord, Jaes Guthrie. A month in Belleau Wood in 1918. Detroit, MI: s.n, 1928. 
 History of the Fifth Regiment Marines, (May 1917–December 31, 1918. Pike, NH: Brass Hat, 2000. 
 Leckie, Robert. Great American battles. Illustrated with maps, prints, and photos. New York: Random House [1968]. 
 Linn, Louis C., Laura Jane Linn Wright, and B. J. Omanson. At Belleau Wood with Rifle and Sketchpad: Memoir of a United States Marine in World War I. Jefferson, MO: McFarland & Co., Publishers, 2012.  
 Marrin, Albert. The Yanks are coming: the United States in the First World War. Princeton, NJ: Recording for the Blind & Dyslexic, 2007. 
 McClellan, Edwin North. The Battle of Belleau Wood. Washington, DC: Historical Section, U.S.M.C., 1930. 
 Mead, Gary. The Doughboys: America and the First World War. New York: Overlook Press, 2000.  
 Metzger, Fritz, and Mark Fuller. Oral History Interview with Fritz Metzger. 1982. 
 Moore, Ray T. With the Marines at Belleau Wood: a vivid description of personal experiences in battle. Wake Forest, NC: Euzelian Society, 1921. 
 Pattullo, George. Hellwood. New York: U.S. Marine Corps Mobilization Bureau, 1918. 
 Pike, Lloyd E. The battle for Belleau Wood, as I remember it, about 60 years later. 1977. 
 Rice, Earle. The Battle of Belleau Wood. San Diego, CA: Lucent Books, 1996.  
 Simmons, Edwin H., and Joseph H. Alexander  Through the wheat: the U.S. Marines in World War I. Annapolis, MD: Naval Institute Press, 2008.  
 
 Stallings, Laurence. Blood Belleau Wood. New York: American Heritage Publishing Co., Inc., 1963. 
 Stephenson, Michael. Battlegrounds: geography and the history of warfare. Washington, DC: National Geographic, 2003.  
 Suskind, Richard. Do you want to live forever!. New York: Bantam Books, 1964. 
 Suskind, Richard. The Battle of Belleau Wood; the Marines stand fast. New York: Macmillan [1969]. 
 Terry, Charles. Wilson's war: America in the First World War. [S.l.: s.n.], 2011.  
 United States. Diary of Fourth Brigade, Marine Corps, Am. E.F. ; May 30, 1918 to June 30, 1918. [S.l.: s.n.], 1918. 
 Venzon, Anne Cipriano. The United States in the First World War: an Encyclopedia. Hoboken, NJ: Taylor and Francis, 2013.  
 Webb, Robert N., and Shannon Stirnweis. Stories of great battles. Racine, WI: Whitman Pub. Co., 1960.

External links

 Battle of Belleau Wood at the American Expeditionary Force website
 Photos of Belleau Wood as it is today
 The Battle of Belleau Wood
 Marines' First Crucible: Belleau Wood
 Battle of Belleau Wood
 Battle of Belleau Wood, 6–26 June 1918
 Devil Dogs in Olive Drab: The 2d Engineers at Belleau Wood
 Belleau Wood Marine Memorial

Conflicts in 1918
1918 in France
Battles of the Western Front (World War I)
Battles of World War I involving the United States
Battles of World War I involving France
Battles of World War I involving the United Kingdom
Battles of World War I involving Germany
United States Marine Corps in World War I
United States Marine Corps lore and symbols
June 1918 events